Lumberjack's favorite (or Lumberjack favorite) is a North American breakfast dish consisting of cooked wild rice with brown sugar and milk or cream.

The dish is very high in calories and carbohydrates, and so was allegedly sometimes eaten by lumberjacks so that they could skip lunch and work all day.

References 

American breakfast foods
Rice dishes